Otto Heller (4 July 1863 – 29 July 1941) author and academic. Heller wrote Prophets of Dissent.

Career
Heller was born in Karlsbad, Bohemia (now Karlovy Vary, Czech Republic). He attended the University of Prague, followed by the universities of Munich, Vienna, and Berlin.  He came to the United States in 1883 as a tutor and secured the post of instructor in Greek at La Salle College in Philadelphia in 1887. Heller received his Ph.D. from the University of Chicago in 1890.

Heller taught briefly at the Massachusetts Institute of Technology before becoming a professor of German language and literature at Washington University in St. Louis in 1892.  In 1914, Heller was promoted to professor of modern European literature in addition to his original professorship, and in 1924 he became the first dean of the Graduate School of Arts and Sciences, a post he held until he became dean emeritus in 1937.

Heller died on 28 July 1941 at his summer cottage in Bellaire, Michigan.

Works 
 Studies in modern German literature (1905)
 Henrik Ibsen: plays and problems (1912)
 Prophets of Dissent: Essays on Maeterlinck, Strindberg, Nietzsche and Tolstoy (1918)

Works or publications

Plays

Collection Editor

Speech

German

Personal life
Heller was married to Jean S. Blair Heller.

See also
 Faust 
 Gerhart Hauptmann
 Henrik Ibsen 
 Maurice Maeterlinck 
 Friedrich Nietzsche
 August Strindberg 
 Charles Sealsfield 
 Hermann Sudermann 
 Leo Tolstoy

Further reading

References

External links
 The Otto Heller Papers Washington University Libraries OCLC 244300985 This collection primarily contains materials related to Heller's scholarly work in modern European literature and literary criticism.
 The Henry W Nordmeyer Papers  
 The Charles Nagel Papers  
 The Henry W. Nordmeyer Papers  

1863 births
1941 deaths
Writers from Karlovy Vary
Comparative literature academics
German literature
American people of Czech descent
University of Chicago alumni
Massachusetts Institute of Technology faculty
Washington University in St. Louis faculty
La Salle University faculty
20th-century scholars
20th-century linguists